{{DISPLAYTITLE:C10H18O3}}
The molecular formula C10H18O3 (molar mass: 186.25 g/mol, exact mass: 186.1256 u) may refer to:

 Cyclobutyrol (CB)
 Epomediol
 Queen bee acid (or 10-HDA)
 Valeric acid anhydride (or valeryl-valerate)

Molecular formulas